Ceroprepes patriciella is a species of snout moth in the genus Ceroprepes. It was described by Zeller in 1867, and is known from India and Japan.

References

Moths described in 1867
Phycitinae
Moths of Japan